The Men's Slalom in the 2017 FIS Alpine Skiing World Cup involved 11 events, including one parallel slalom (specifically, a city event, which only includes 16 racers). The last race of the season was at the World Cup finals in Aspen, and Marcel Hirscher of Austria won his fourth championship in the discipline, all in the prior five years, on the way to his sixth straight overall men's championship. 

Hirscher clinched the title with a fourth-place finish in the next-to-last race at Kranjska Gora, which gave him a 110-point lead over Henrik Kristoffersen of Norway in the discipline with just 100 points left to win.

The season was interrupted by the 2017 World Ski Championships, which were held from 6–20 February in St. Moritz, Switzerland. The men's slalom was held on 19 February.

Standings
 

Updated at 19 March 2017 after all events.

See also
 2017 Alpine Skiing World Cup – Men's summary rankings
 2017 Alpine Skiing World Cup – Men's Overall
 2017 Alpine Skiing World Cup – Men's Downhill
 2017 Alpine Skiing World Cup – Men's Super-G
 2017 Alpine Skiing World Cup – Men's Giant Slalom
 2017 Alpine Skiing World Cup – Men's Combined

References

External links
 Alpine Skiing at FIS website

Men's Slalom
FIS Alpine Ski World Cup slalom men's discipline titles